The Battle of Haugsnes was fought at Haugsnes, a low peninsula south of Flugumýri in Skagafjörður, Northern Iceland. The battle was fought on April 19, 1246 between the forces of Þórður kakali Sighvatsson and those of Brandur Kolbeinsson. Þórður was victorious. It was the bloodiest battle ever to be fought in Icelandic history, with about 110 casualties in total, amongst them Brandur Kolbeinsson, chieftain of the Ásbirningar family clan. Defeat in battle led to the end of power for the Ásbirningar.

The artist and farmer Sigurður Hansen of Kringlumýri created a memorial for the battle at the site, consisting of more than 1100 boulders in battle order, each representing a combatant. Those who fell are marked with iron crosses.

References

Árni Daníel Júlíusson, Jón Ólafur Ísberg, Helgi Skúli Kjartansson Íslenskur sögu atlas: 1. bindi: Frá öndverðu til 18. aldar (Almenna bókafélagið, Reykjavík: 1989)

13th century in Iceland
Haugsnes
Haugsnes
1246 in Europe